Ulhówek  is a village in Tomaszów Lubelski County, Lublin Voivodeship, in eastern Poland, close to the border with Ukraine. It is the seat of the gmina (administrative district) called Gmina Ulhówek. The village is located in the historical region Galicia.

The village has a population of 1,262.

References

Villages in Tomaszów Lubelski County